Dança dos Famosos 2010 was the seventh season of the Brazilian reality television show Dança dos Famosos which premiered on April 11, 2010 with the competitive live shows beginning on the following week on April 18, 2010 at 7:30 p.m./6:30 p.m. (BRT/AMT) on Rede Globo.

Twelve celebrities were paired with twelve professional ballroom dancers. The celebrities did not know their professional partners until they were introduced to each other at the launch show.

Journalist Adriana Colin, who was fired by the show's producers did not return as co-hostess for this season. Faustão announced that his new co-hostess would be journalist Thalita Morette in December 2009.

Actress Fernanda Souza won the competition over actress Sheron Menezzes.

Overview

 The season follows the same rules from the sixth season. However, the wild card round feature the first six couples eliminated instead of the four. Surprisingly, two couples (instead of one) were brought back into the competition.
 For the first time in the series, the eight remaining couples were split again into two new groups, with two male and female celebrity couples each. Each celebrity would dancing on their respective group's night.
 The final round (merge) would only come on week 10, where the final six couples danced together for the first time at the same night.

Couples

Scoring chart

Average Chart

Couples who did not get on the scores stage are listed in order of placement.

Weekly results

Week 1 
Presentation of the Celebrities
Aired: April 11, 2010

Week 2 
Week 1 – Men
Style: Disco
Aired: April 18, 2010

Week 3 
Week 1 – Women
Style: Disco
Aired: April 25, 2010

Week 4 
Week 2 – Men
Style: Forró
Aired: May 2, 2010

Week 5 
Week 2 – Women
Style: Forró
Aired: May 9, 2010

Week 6 
Week 3 – Men
Style: Lambada
Aired: May 16, 2010

Week 7 
Week 3 – Women
Style: Lambada
Aired: May 23, 2010

Week 8 
Repechage
Style: Foxtrot
Aired: May 30, 2010

Week 9 
Team A
Style: Salsa
Aired: June 6, 2010

Week 10 
Team B
Style: Salsa
Aired: June 13, 2010

Week 11 
Top 6
Style: Country
Aired: June 20, 2010

Week 12 
Top 5
Style: Rock and Roll
Aired: June 27, 2010

Week 13 
Top 4
Style: Gypsy
Aired: July 4, 2010

Week 14 
Top 3
Style: Waltz
Aired: July 11, 2010

Week 15 
Top 2 – Week 1
Style: Street Dance & Tango
Aired: July 18, 2010

Week 16 
Top 2 – Week 2
Style: Paso Doble & Samba
Aired: July 25, 2010

References

External links
 Official Site 

Season 07
2010 Brazilian television seasons

pt:Dança dos Famosos 7
pt:Dança dos Famosos